Elvin John "Al" Cassell (December 3, 1896 – August 28, 1970) was an American football and basketball coach and college athletics administrator. He served as the head football coach at Olivet College in Olivet, Michigan from 1926 to 1929, and Jamestown College—now known as the University of Jamestown—in Jamestown, North Dakota, from 1930 to 1946 and again from 1951 to 1953. His football record at Jamestown was 65–49–13. Cassell was also the athletic director and head basketball coach at Jamestown from 1930 to 1964.

A native of Alexandria, Minnesota, Cassell was a four-sport star in high school. He attended Carleton College in Northfield, Minnesota, where he lettered four times each in football and baseball. He was a pitcher in baseball and also ran track. Cassell graduated from Carleton in 1925 and served as athletic director at Epworth Military Academy in Epworth, Iowa from 1925 to 1926.

After retiring from Jamestown in 1964, Cassell worked in life insurance sales and in scouting for the Minnesota Twins of Major League Baseball (MLB). He died on August 28, 1970.

Head coaching record

Football

References

External links
 

1896 births
1970 deaths
American football halfbacks
Baseball pitchers
Carleton Knights baseball players
Carleton Knights football players
Jamestown Jimmies athletic directors
Jamestown Jimmies football coaches
Jamestown Jimmies men's basketball coaches
Olivet Comets athletic directors
Olivet Comets football coaches
Olivet Comets men's basketball coaches
College men's track and field athletes in the United States
People from Alexandria, Minnesota
Coaches of American football from Minnesota
Players of American football from Minnesota
Baseball players from Minnesota
Basketball coaches from Minnesota
Track and field athletes from Minnesota